USRC Active, was a revenue boat of the United States Revenue Cutter Service in commission from 1843 to 1847.  She was the fourth Revenue Cutter Service ship to bear the name.

History
Built at Sackets Harbor, New York, in 1843, Active was based there and served on Lake Ontario. She was under the command of First Lieutenant William B. Whitehead. She appears to have left service in 1847.

Notes
Citations

References used

 
 
 

Ships of the United States Revenue Cutter Service
Age of Sail ships of the United States
Great Lakes ships
Ships built in Sackets Harbor, New York
1843 ships